Myllypuro is a neighbourhood in the city of Tampere, Finland near border of the Nokia municipality. It got its name from the Myllypuro flowing between the district and Ikuri, whose old name is Tuohijoki or also Myllyoja.

References

External links
Myllypuro in Tampere website (in Finnish)
Conservation area of Myllypuro(in Finnish)

Districts of Tampere